The House of Flowers is a 1950 short story by Truman Capote, first published in Botteghe Oscure Quaderno VI and reprinted in Breakfast at Tiffany's. It was adapted into a musical of the same name.

Notes

References 

1950 short stories
Short stories by Truman Capote